The National Hydropower Association (NHA) represents the interests of the U.S. hydropower industry, which includes all forms of water energy—conventional, hydrokinetic, tidal and ocean.

Since 1983, NHA has represented the majority of domestic, non-federal hydroelectric producers. The association has some 200 members which include public utilities, investor-owned utilities, independent power producers, equipment manufacturers, environmental and engineering consultants, and hydropower attorneys from all regions of the country. Its mission is to protect and promote the nation's largest renewable resource through its legislative, regulatory, technical and public communications activities.

See also

Hydroelectricity
Solar Energy Industries Association
American Wind Energy Association
List of renewable energy organizations

References

www.enerset.eu

Hydropower organizations
Renewable energy organizations based in the United States